In This Light and on This Evening is the third studio album by English rock band Editors. It was released on 12 October 2009 by Kitchenware Records. The band had said the material would have a more raw and anthemic sound compared to their previous work. The first single from the album was "Papillon". The second single was "You Don't Know Love", released on 25 January of the following year. The third single, "Eat Raw Meat = Blood Drool", was released on 24 May. The album also features a bonus extended play of five songs, called Cuttings II. With lead guitarist Chris Urbanowicz's departure from Editors on 16 April 2012, this was the band's last album to feature Urbanowicz.

Overview

Smith's home city of London dominates the album, both lyrically and musically. He said: "'I actually think it's in every song. In the right time and place, in the right light and on the right evening, something you have seen 1,000 times before can still take your breath away whilst the background of electronic whirrs and hums that run under many of the tracks mimic the constant background noise of the city."

Critical reception

The album was met with mixed reviews. On the review aggregator site Metacritic, the album got a score of 59/100, indicating "mixed or average reviews", based on 25 reviews from mainstream critics.

Track listing
All tracks written by Edward Lay, Russell Leetch, Tom Smith, and Chris Urbanowicz.

Personnel
Personnel adapted from album liner notes.

Tom Smith, Chris Urbanowicz, Russell Leetch, Edward Lay – band members
Flood – production
Ben Hillier – mixing, production
Tim Young – mastering
Cenzo Townshend, Rob Kirwan – mixing
Darren Lawson – mixing assistant
Liliane Lijn – cover art design
Tom Hingston Studio – design and art direction

Commercial performance
Following its release, the album debuted at number one on the UK Albums Chart. It however had a very short chart life, only spending three weeks in the top 40 and five on the top 75, dropping from the top spot to No. 13 in its second week. This makes the album one of the shortest runners to reach number one, matching the five weeks by Little Angels "Jam" in 1993, an album which also dropped to No. 13 the week after.

In 2012 it was awarded a double gold certification from the Independent Music Companies Association which indicated sales of at least 150,000 copies throughout Europe.

Charts

Weekly charts

Year-end charts

Certifications

References

2009 albums
Albums produced by Flood (producer)
Editors (band) albums
Kitchenware Records albums